is a city located in Nagano Prefecture, Japan. , the city had an estimated population of 68,177 in 27587 households, and a population density of 100 persons per km². In 2016, the former town of Takatō, now part of Ina, was selected as one of The Most Beautiful Villages in Japan.

Geography

Ina is located in south-central Nagano prefecture. It is bordered to the east by the Akaishi Mountains, including Mount Nyukasa (1955 meters), Mount Nokogiri (2685 meters), Mount Senjō (3033 meters), and Mount Shiomi (3047 meters). The Tenryū River runs through the city.

Surrounding municipalities
Nagano Prefecture
Komagane
Shiojiri
Suwa
Chino
Suwa District: Fujimi
Kamiina District: Minowa, Minamiminowa, Miyada
Shimoina District: Ōshika
Kiso District: Kiso (town)
Yamanashi Prefecture
Minami-Alps
Hokuto
Shizuoka Prefecture
Aoi-ku, Shizuoka

Climate
The city has a climate characterized by hot and humid summers, and relatively mild winters (Köppen climate classification Cfa).

History
The area of present-day Ina was part of ancient Shinano Province. The area was part of the holdings of Takatō Domain during the Edo period and Ina developed as a jōkamachi surrounding Ina Castle and as a river port on the Tenryū River. The village of Ina was established within Ina District the creation of the municipalities system on April 1, 1889 and was raised to town status on October 15, 1897. The town of Ina merged with the villages of Tomigata, Misuzu, Tera, Higashiharuchika and Nishiminowa (all from Kitaiina District) to form the city of Ina on April 1, 1954. Ina annexed the village of Nishiharuchika in 1965. On March 31, 2006, Ina absorbed the town of Takatō, and the village of Hase (both from Kamiina District to create the new and expanded city of Ina.

Demographics
Per Japanese census data, the population of Ina has remained relatively stable over the past 70 years.

Government
Ina has a mayor-council form of government with a directly elected mayor and a unicameral city legislature of 21 members.

Economy
The economy of Ina is largely agricultural, with rice, pears, tomatoes and dairy farming as major components. The manufacturing sector includes electronics and precision instrumentation. Rubycon Corporation, an electronic components company has its headquarters in the city.

Education
Ina has 15 public elementary schools and six public middle schools operated by the city government. There are three public high schools operated by the Nagano Prefectural Board of Education and one private high school. The prefecture also operated one special education school.

The city has one international school (Colégio Desafio) - Brazilian primary school.

Transportation

Railway
 East Japan Railway Company - Iida Line
  -  -  -  -

Highway
 Nagano Expressway

Sister city relations

International
 - Beijing, China (from on November 22, 1994 as a friendship city)

Domestic
Chita, Aichi Prefecture (from November 7, 1994 as a friendship city)
Miyake, Tokyo (became allies on April 21, 1970)
Shinjuku, Tokyo (from July 12, 1986)
Aizuwakamatsu, Fukushima (from September 24, 2004)
Iwanashiro, Fukushima (from September 23, 1994)
Iwata, Shizuoka Prefecture (became allies on August 1, 1984)

Local attractions
Takatō Castle

References

External links

Official Website 

 
Cities in Nagano Prefecture